Pepperbox is an unincorporated community in Sussex County, Delaware, United States. Pepperbox is located on Sussex County Road 62, north of the Maryland border.

References

Unincorporated communities in Sussex County, Delaware
Unincorporated communities in Delaware